Ernest Cox (1883–1959) was an English electrical engineer.

Ernest Cox may also refer to:

Ernest Gordon Cox (1906–1996), English chemist
Ernest Stewart Cox (1900–1992), British engineer

See also
Earnest Cox (disambiguation), a disambiguation page for people named "Earnest Cox"